Tom Quinn (born January 27, 1968) is an American football coach most recently served as the assistant special teams coach for the New York Giants of the National Football League (NFL).  He previously spent 11 years as the special teams coordinator for the New York Giants, where he was a part of two Super Bowl winning teams.

Career

New York Giants (2006-2021)
Quinn was hired by the Giants to serve as their assistant special teams coach under Mike Sweatman for the 2006 season. After one season, he was promoted to special teams coach. In 2007, Lawrence Tynes kicked a game-winning 47 yard field goal in overtime to send the Giants to Super Bowl XLII, as they defeated the Green Bay Packers 23-20. In 2011, Tynes again kicked a game-winning field goal in overtime, as his 31-yard kick sent the Giants to Super Bowl XLVI, as they defeated the San Francisco 49ers. During his tenure as special teams coach, the Giants have seen mixed results. His first season saw the Giants rank 11th in special teams. Since then, they have ranked near the middle or bottom of the league in each season.

Following the 2017 season, Quinn was fired by the Giants, however, he was re-hired as Assistant Special Teams Coach under Thomas McGaughey after the latter was diagnosed with cancer.

Following the 2021 season, Quinn was again relieved of duties by new head coach Brian Daboll.

References

External links
 New York Giants profile

Living people
American football linebackers
Arizona Wildcats football players
Boston University Terriers football coaches
Davidson Wildcats football coaches
Holy Cross Crusaders football coaches
James Madison Dukes football coaches
New York Giants coaches
San Jose State Spartans football coaches
Stanford Cardinal football coaches
1968 births